Arthur Nigel Davenport (23 May 1928 – 25 October 2013) was an English stage, television and film actor, best known as the Duke of Norfolk and Lord Birkenhead in the Academy Award-winning films A Man for All Seasons and Chariots of Fire, respectively.

Early life and education
Davenport was born in Great Shelford, Cambridgeshire, son of Arthur Henry Davenport and Katherine Lucy (née Meiklejohn). His father was an engineer, educated at Sidney Sussex College, Cambridge before being employed as an engineer for the Midland Railway, and was later a lecturer in engineering, a Fellow, and the bursar at his alma mater, Sidney Sussex College, Cambridge; he had served for four years in the Royal Engineers during World War I, and was awarded a Military Cross. Nigel's great-uncle, Major Matthew Fontaine Maury Meiklejohn, was awarded a Victoria Cross during the Second Boer War.

He grew up in an academic family and was educated at St Peter's School, Seaford, Cheltenham College and Trinity College, Oxford. Originally he chose to study Philosophy, Politics and Economics but switched to English on the advice of one of his tutors.

In the 1950s Davenport undertook National Service with the Royal Army Service Corps as a disc jockey on the British Forces Broadcasting Service in Hamburg>.

Career
Davenport first appeared on stage at the Savoy Theatre and then with the Shakespeare Memorial Company, before joining the English Stage Company, one of its earliest members, at the Royal Court Theatre in 1956. He began appearing in British film and television productions in supporting roles, including a walk-on in Tony Richardson's film, Look Back in Anger (1959). Subsequent roles included a theatre manager opposite Laurence Olivier in the film version of The Entertainer and a policeman in Michael Powell's Peeping Tom (both 1960).

In the 1962 last episode of the first season of the TV series The Saint, titled "The Charitable Countess", with Roger Moore as Simon Templar and Patricia Donahue as Countess Rovagna, Davenport played a supporting role as the Countess's confidant, Aldo Petri.

He made an impression as Thomas Howard, 3rd Duke of Norfolk in A Man for All Seasons (1966), co-starred with Michael Caine in the war movie Play Dirty, and had a major role as Lord Bothwell in Mary, Queen of Scots. In 1972, he appeared as George Adamson, opposite Susan Hampshire in Living Free, the sequel to Born Free.

During the production of Stanley Kubrick's 1968 film 2001: A Space Odyssey, Davenport read the lines of HAL 9000 off-camera during the computer's dialogues with actors Keir Dullea and Gary Lockwood. However, Kubrick thought that Davenport's English accent was too distracting, and after a few weeks he dismissed him, so Canadian actor Douglas Rain was ultimately chosen for the role. Davenport took the leading role in the off-beat Phase IV (1974), which failed to find an audience. In 1979, he portrayed King George III in Prince Regent.

He appeared as Ebenezer Scrooge's grudging father Silas in the George C. Scott version of A Christmas Carol (1984), and played opposite Michael Caine again in the 1988 Sherlock Holmes spoof Without A Clue, which was Davenport's second-to-last feature film.

He portrayed The Duke of Holdernesse in a 1993 BBC Radio dramatization of the Sherlock Holmes story "The Adventure of the Priory School".

In February 1997, Davenport was the subject of This Is Your Life when he was surprised by Michael Aspel at David Nicholson's stables near Cheltenham.

He was president of Equity from 1986 to 1992.

Personal life
Davenport was married twice, first to Helena Margaret White whom he met while he was studying at Oxford University. They married in 1951 and had a daughter, Laura, and a son, Hugo. His second wife was actress Maria Aitken with whom he had a second son, Jack, also an actor, best known for appearing in Pirates of the Caribbean. According to Jerry Bruckheimer, producer of the Pirates of the Caribbean films, Jack was cast as the James Norrington character, partly because of Nigel's involvement in A High Wind in Jamaica.

Filmography

Film

Television

References

External links
 Nigel Davenport at the British Film Institute
 

1928 births
2013 deaths
Aitken family
Alumni of Trinity College, Oxford
English male film actors
English male stage actors
English male television actors
People educated at Cheltenham College
Male actors from Cambridgeshire
Place of death missing
British trade union leaders
English trade unionists
People from Great Shelford